Electrona paucirastra, the belted lanternfish, is a lanternfish found around the globe in the southern hemisphere between 35° S and 48° S.  It grows to a length of  SL. It is a mesopelagic species, which can be found close to surface at night-time.

References
 

Myctophidae
Taxa named by Rolf Ling Bolin
Fish described in 1962